The 1933 Cork Senior Football Championship was the 45th staging of the Cork Senior Football Championship since its establishment by the Cork County Board in 1887.

Beara were the defending champions.

On 15 October 1933, Beara won the championship following a 2–05 to 0–04 defeat of Clonakilty in the final at Clonakilty. This was their second championship title overall and their second title in succession.

Results

Final

References

Cork Senior Football Championship